Bryan Marshall (19 May 1938 – 25 June 2019) was a British actor, with a number of major credits in film and television to his name, in both his native country and Australia.

Early life
Marshall was born in Battersea, south London. He was educated at the Salesian College, Battersea, and trained as an actor at RADA, before appearing at the Bristol Old Vic and in repertory theatre and in the 1986 first national tour of The Sound of Music as Captain von Trapp.

Film
Marshall's best-remembered film role is that of Councillor Harris in The Long Good Friday (1980). His other film credits include Rasputin the Mad Monk (1966), Alfie (1966), The Witches (1966), The Viking Queen (1967), Quatermass and the Pit (1967), Mosquito Squadron (1969), I Start Counting (1970), Man in the Wilderness (1971), Because of the Cats (1973), The Tamarind Seed (1974) and The Spy Who Loved Me (1977). 
His later film career included roles in Australian productions such as BMX Bandits (1983), Bliss (1985), The Man from Snowy River II (1988), The Punisher (1989) with Dolph Lundgren, Country Life (1994) and Selkie (2000).

Television
Marshall had several leading roles on television, notably Dobbin in the 1967 production of Vanity Fair, Gilbert Markham in the 1968 serial of The Tenant of Wildfell Hall and Wentworth in the 1971 adaptation of Persuasion. Other television credits include: Spindoe, Warship, United!, The Forsyte Saga, Dixon of Dock Green, Z-Cars, The Saint, The Avengers, Rooms (1975), The Onedin Line, Out, The Professionals, Return of the Saint, Buccaneer, The Chinese Detective,  Robin of Sherwood, Heartbeat, The Bill and Dalziel and Pascoe.

He also worked extensively in Australia, with credits including Prisoner, Special Squad, Golden Pennies,  Neighbours, Embassy, Home and Away, Stingers, Water Rats and All Saints.

In 1989, Marshall was the original host of Australia's Most Wanted, an Australian version of the show America's Most Wanted which was focused on helping the police with unsolved crimes.

Marshall died at the age of 81 on 25 June 2019; no cause was given.

Filmography

Notes

References

External links
 

1938 births
2019 deaths
Alumni of RADA
People from Clapham
English male film actors
English male television actors
Australian male television actors
Male actors from London
English people of Irish descent